Kaapalika is a 1973 Indian Malayalam film, directed and produced by Crossbelt Mani. The film stars Sheela, Adoor Bhasi, Jose Prakash and Nambiyathu in the lead roles. The film had musical score by R. K. Shekhar.

Cast

Sheela as Kaapaalika / Rosamma
Adoor Bhasi as Pothachan/Peter/Alex's Father
Jose Prakash as Priest
Nambiyathu
N. N. Pillai as Lazar, Rosamma's Father
A. Madhavan
Bahadoor as Gopalan
K. P. Ummer as Alex/Mr. Nair
Kuthiravattam Pappu as Ithakku
Madhu Menon
Mathew Plathottam
N. Govindankutty as A. G. Nambiar
Omana as Atha
Paravoor Bharathan as Adibharamantha Swami/Antony
Philomina as Eali/Rosamma's Mother
Rani Chandra as Lillykutti
Veeran as  Ittooppu
Vijayaraghavan (debut) as Babu

Soundtrack
The music was composed by R. K. Shekhar and the lyrics were written by N. N. Pillai and Vayalar Ramavarma.

References

External links
 

1973 films
1970s Malayalam-language films
Films directed by Crossbelt Mani